Group 1 of the 1962 FIFA World Cup took place from 30 May to 7 June 1962. The group consisted of Colombia, the Soviet Union, Uruguay, and Yugoslavia.

Standings

Matches
All times listed are local time.

Uruguay vs Colombia
Colombians opened the score midway through the first half when Francisco Zuluaga converted a penalty. Uruguayan harsh tackling led to Zuluaga's injury. In the second half Uruguay could come back from behind with Luis Cubilla and José Sasía's shots.

Soviet Union vs Yugoslavia
The Soviet Union dominated the game from the beginning. Soon after half time, they opened the score when Viktor Ponedelnik hit the bar with a free kick and Valentin Ivanov headed in the rebound. In the last minutes, Ponedelnik scored from the edge of the area.

Tragedy struck ten minutes before the final whistle, when Eduard Dubinski was carried away with a broken leg after a clash with Muhamed Mujić, who was later sent home by his team. Dubinski died almost seven years later in 1969 of sarcoma.

Yugoslavia vs Uruguay

Soviet Union vs Colombia
The Soviet team scored three quick goals in the first 11 minutes of the game but then let the Colombians make an impressive comeback in the late second half. In the 68 minute Marcos Coll scored a goal directly from a corner, the first Olympic goal in World Cup history.

Soviet Union vs Uruguay

Yugoslavia vs Colombia

References

External links
 1962 FIFA World Cup archive

1962 FIFA World Cup
Yugoslavia at the 1962 FIFA World Cup
Uruguay at the 1962 FIFA World Cup
Colombia at the 1962 FIFA World Cup
Soviet Union at the 1962 FIFA World Cup